Mangelia sciola is a species of sea snail, a marine gastropod mollusk in the family Mangeliidae.

Description
The length of the shell attains 3 mm, diameter 1.5 mm.

Distribution
This marine species occurs off South Africa.

References

External links
  Tucker, J.K. 2004 Catalog of recent and fossil turrids (Mollusca: Gastropoda). Zootaxa 682:1–1295.
 

Endemic fauna of South Africa
sciola
Gastropods described in 1958